The 2013 Giro del Trentino was the 37th edition of the Giro del Trentino cycling stage race. It started on 16 April in Lienz (Austria) and ended on 19 April in Sega di Ala. The race, that was officially presented on 8 April in Trento, consisted of four stages, with the first one divided into two half-stages.

The race was won by Astana rider Vincenzo Nibali, who claimed the leader's jersey in the final stage and won the King of the Mountains classification as well. Mauro Santambrogio (Vini Fantini-Selle Italia) was second and Maxime Bouet of Ag2r–La Mondiale completed the podium. In the race's other classifications, Jarlinson Pantano of  won the Sprints classification and 's Fabio Aru won the Young Rider classification, with  finishing at the head of the Teams classification.

Teams
Six World Tour teams took part in the race: Ag2r–La Mondiale, Astana, BMC, Cannondale, Lampre–Merida and Team Sky. Among the riders, there were six Grand Tour-winners: Vincenzo Nibali, Bradley Wiggins, Cadel Evans, Ivan Basso, Michele Scarponi and Stefano Garzelli.

A total of 18 teams were invited to the race:

Race overview

Stages

Stage 1a
16 April 2013 – Lienz (Austria) to Lienz,

Stage 1b
16 April 2013 – Lienz,  team time trial (TTT)

Stage 2
17 April 2013 – Sillian (Austria) to Vetriolo Terme,

Stage 3
18 April 2013 – Pergine Valsugana to Condino (Valle del Chiese),

Stage 4
19 April 2013 – Arco to Sega di Ala,

Classification leadership table

Final standings

General classification

King of the Mountains classification

Points classification

Young Rider classification

Teams classification

References

External links
 

Giro del Trentino
2013 in Italian sport
Tour of the Alps